David James Atkins (11 October 1940 – 23 April 2008) was an English actor mostly known for portraying Sharkey in Britannia Hospital, Moving Man No.1 in Clive Barker's Hellraiser in 1987, and pub landlord Les in Men Behaving Badly.

Atkins died of heart failure in 2008, at age 67.

Filmography
 The Odd Job (1978) – Milkman
 Britannia Hospital (1982) – Sharkey
 Mr. Love (1985) – Undertaker
 Personal Services (1987) – Sydney
 Prick Up Your Ears (1987) – Mr. Sugden
 Hellraiser (1987) – Moving Man No.1

Television
 Men Behaving Badly (1992–1996) Les the dribbly landlord of the Crown pub
 Minder (1982) as Kenny
 The Upper Hand (1990–1993) as Pixie
 Minder (1993) as Punter

References

External links

1940 births
2008 deaths
English male film actors
English male television actors
Male actors from Plymouth, Devon